is a Japanese physicist and chemist. 
National Institutes of Natural Sciences, Japan (NIMS), Institute for Molecular Science (IMS)

Education and career 
1987 Graduated from Faculty of Engineering, The University of Tokyo
1992 Ph. D, The University of Tokyo
1992 Research Associate, Tohoku University
2001 Associate Professor, Tohoku University
2003 Full Professor, IMS
2007–2010 Director, Laser Research Center for Molecular Science, IMS
2010–present Chairman, Department of Photo-Molecular Science, IMS
2004–2005 Visiting Professor, Tohoku University
2007–2008 Visiting Professor, Tokyo Institute of Technology
2009–2011 Visiting Professor, The University of Tokyo
2014–2016 Visiting Professor, University of Strasbourg
2012–present Visiting Professor(Humboldt Awardee), University of Heidelberg

Research 
Kenji Ohmori has succeeded in designing and visualizing spatiotemporal images given by the interference of matter waves of atoms in a molecule with picometer and femtosecond resolution [1,2]. The precision of this processing is the highest to date, higher than that of the current nanotechnology by three orders of magnitudes. This ultrahigh-precision processing has been implemented with the temporal oscillations of laser electric fields engineered with attosecond precision and imprinted on the matter waves of atoms and electrons in a molecule. He has utilized this technique to develop a molecular computer in which a single 0.3-nanometer-size molecule can calculate 1000 times faster than the current fastest supercomputer [3,4]. He has also developed an ultrafast quantum simulator that can simulate non-equilibrium dynamics of quantum many-body systems in one nanosecond, introducing a novel concept where he has combined his ultrafast coherent control with attosecond precision and ultracold atoms cooled down to temperatures close to absolute zero[5].

Honors and awards 
 1998　Award by Research Foundation for Opto-Science and Technology
 2007　JSPS Prize
 2007　Japan Academy Medal
 2008　Norman Hascoe Distinguished Lecturer, University of Connecticut, USA
 2009　Fellow of the American Physical Society
 2012　Humboldt Prize
 2017　Matsuo Foundation Hiroshi Takuma Memorial Prize
 2018　Commendation for Science and Technology by the Minister of Education, Culture, Sports, Science and Technology of Japan
 2021　National Medal with Purple Ribbon

References

External links 
 National Institutes of Natural Sciences (NINS)
 Institute for Molecular Science (IMS)
 Kenji Ohmori, Interview in YouTube

1962 births
Living people
People from Kumamoto
Japanese physicists
Japanese chemists
University of Tokyo alumni
Academic staff of the University of Tokyo
Academic staff of Tokyo Institute of Technology
Academic staff of Tohoku University
Recipients of the Medal with Purple Ribbon
Fellows of the American Physical Society